Chessington North railway station, in the Royal Borough of Kingston upon Thames in South West London, is on the Chessington branch line and is served by South Western Railway. The station serves Hook as well as the northern part of Chessington.

History

Like all others on the branch, the station is built in the concrete Art Deco style of the 1930s. It was designed by the architect James Robb Scott, and it opened on 28 May 1939.

Services 
South Western Railway operates all the services on the Chessington branch line and all trains that terminate at Chessington South railway station. In the inbound direction, trains service the station every thirty minutes during both peak and off-peak hours. Local trains run at all times to London Waterloo, calling at all stations apart from Queenstown Road. These trains take 35 minutes to arrive at London Waterloo.

In the outbound direction, Chessington North is the penultimate station on the line, with trains taking two minutes to arrive at Chessington South.

The ticket office is at surface level. There is one automated ticket machine, which is next to the ticket office.

Connections
London Buses route 71 serves the station during the day, and route N65 at night.

References 

Railway stations in the Royal Borough of Kingston upon Thames
Former Southern Railway (UK) stations
Railway stations in Great Britain opened in 1939
Railway stations served by South Western Railway
Art Deco architecture in London
Art Deco railway stations
James Robb Scott buildings